The Jacksonville Downtown Historic District is a national historic district in downtown Jacksonville, Illinois. The district encompasses a commercial area surrounding Central Park, the city's public square. Development in the district began in 1825, when Jacksonville was platted and the public square was created; the first buildings on the square were built the same year. Most of the buildings in the district were built between the 1840s and 1940s, and a large number were built during a late nineteenth century building boom. Seven of the buildings were once cigar stores, a reflection of Jacksonville's large cigar making industry. The district includes examples of many of the popular architectural styles of the nineteenth and twentieth centuries; Italianate and Victorian buildings are especially common.

The district was added to the National Register of Historic Places on September 14, 2018.

References

National Register of Historic Places in Morgan County, Illinois
Historic districts on the National Register of Historic Places in Illinois
Italianate architecture in Illinois
Victorian architecture in Illinois